I'll Prove It to You is the second album by the American musician Gregory Abbott. It was released in 1988.

The album peaked at No. 132 on the Billboard 200. The title track peaked in the top 10 on the Hot Black Singles chart.

Production
The album was produced by Abbott; he also played drums. The title track is performed as a ballad; "Prisoner of Love" was done in a funk style.

Critical reception

The Los Angeles Times called "Crazy for You" "a slow-drag '50s-sounding ballad that Jackie Wilson would've had a ball recording." The Washington Post opined that "Abbott's at his best with slow, swaying ballads like 'Unfinished Business', but the overall effect is ignorable." USA Today deemed Abbott "a minor talent marketed like a superstar, and his everyman voice does little more than highlight his mediocre original material."

The Christian Science Monitor stated that Abbott "throws in a couple of '50s-style rhythm-and-blues numbers, where he lets loose his Smokey Robinson falsetto." The Philadelphia Inquirer determined that Abbott's "material is weak and repetitive, but his singing is still strong and confident."

AllMusic wrote that the album "finds the vocalist in the same vein as his previous effort; merging '80s music technology with '50s doowop/early-'60s soul-tinged sensibility."

Track listing

References

1988 albums
Gregory Abbott albums
Columbia Records albums